The 2019–20 Premier League International Cup was the sixth season of the Premier League International Cup, a European club football competition organised by the Premier League for under-23 players.
Bayern Munich were champions in the previous season, after beating Dinamo Zagreb 2–0 in the final, but they were unable to defend their title as they did not enter this season's tournament.

The tournament was suspended due to the COVID-19 pandemic after quarter-final matches on 10 March 2020, and was originally to restart on 25 June 2020. However, the season was eventually cancelled on 1 May 2020.

Format
The competition features twenty-four teams: twelve from English league system and twelve invitees from other European countries. The teams are split into six groups of four - with two English league clubs per group. The group winners, and two best runners-up, will progress into the knockout phase of the tournament. The knockout matches will be single leg fixtures.

All matches - including fixtures between non-English teams - will be played in England and Wales.

Teams

English league system:
 Arsenal
 Blackburn Rovers
 Brighton & Hove Albion
 Derby County
 Everton
 Leicester City
 Liverpool
 Newcastle United
 Southampton
 West Ham United
 Wolverhampton Wanderers
 Swansea City

Other countries:
 Athletic Bilbao
 Valencia
 Villarreal
 Hertha BSC
 VfL Wolfsburg
 Feyenoord
 PSV Eindhoven
 Benfica
 Porto
 Paris Saint-Germain
 Dinamo Zagreb
 AS Monaco

Group stage

Group A

Group B

Group C

Group D

Group E

Group F

Ranking of second-placed teams

Knockout stages

Quarter-finals

References

Premier League International Cup
2019–20 Premier League
Premier League International Cup